This is a list of Danish television related events from 1957.

Events
17 February - Birthe Wilke & Gustav Winckler are selected to represent Denmark at the 1957 Eurovision Song Contest with their song "Skibet skal sejle i nat". They are selected to be the first Danish Eurovision entry during Dansk Melodi Grand Prix held at the Radiohouse in Copenhagen.
3 March - Denmark enters the Eurovision Song Contest for the first time with "Skibet skal sejle i nat" performed by Birthe Wilke & Gustav Winckler.

Debuts

Television shows

Ending this year

Births

See also
 1957 in Denmark

Deaths